A 1976 statue of Martin Luther King Jr. and Emmett Till by Ed Rose, sometimes called Martin Luther King, Jr., Prophet for Peace, is installed in Pueblo, Colorado. The sculpture was previously installed in Denver's City Park, before being relocated and replaced with another statue of King. The bronze sculpture measures approximately 11 x 4 x 4 ft., and rests on a marble base that measures approximately 8 x 7 x 7 ft.

See also

 Civil rights movement in popular culture

References

Bronze sculptures in Colorado
Buildings and structures in Pueblo, Colorado
Emmett Till
Marble sculptures in the United States
Memorials to Martin Luther King Jr.
Monuments and memorials in Colorado
Outdoor sculptures in Colorado
Sculptures of Martin Luther King Jr.
Sculptures of men in Colorado
Statues in Colorado